This is a list of schools in the Metropolitan Borough of Trafford in the English county of Greater Manchester.

State-funded schools
In the state-funded sector Trafford maintains a selective education system, with grammar schools assessed by the 11-plus exam. Absences from Trafford secondary schools in 2006–07, authorised and unauthorised, were 5.6% and 0.8% respectively, both lower than the national average (6.4% and 1.4%). From the 2011 GCSE results, the Trafford Local Education Authority was ranked 5th in the country – and first in Greater Manchester – based on the percentage of pupils attaining at least 5 A*–C grades at GCSE including maths and English (69.8% compared with the national average of 58.2%).

From the 2007 GCSE results and A-level results, Altrincham Grammar School for Girls was the most successful secondary school in Trafford, with 100% of pupils gaining five or more GCSEs at A*–C grade including maths and English. At A-level, Altrincham Grammar School for Girls was the 39th most successful school in the country.

Primary schools

Acre Hall Primary School, Flixton
All Saints' RC Primary School, Sale
Altrincham CE Primary School, Altrincham
Barton Clough Primary School, Stretford
Bollin Primary School, Bowdon
Bowdon CE Primary School, Bowdon
Broadheath Primary School, Broadheath
Brooklands Primary School, Sale
Broomwood Primary School, Timperley
Cloverlea Primary School, Timperley
Davyhulme Primary School, Davyhulme
Elmridge Primary School, Hale Barns
English Martyrs RC Primary School, Urmston
Firs Primary School, Sale
Flixton Primary School, Flixton
Forest Gate Academy, Partington
Gorse Hill Primary School, Stretford
Heyes Lane Primary School, Timperley
Highfield Primary School, Urmston
Holy Family RC Primary School, Sale
Kings Road Primary School, Firswood
Kingsway Primary School, Davyhulme
Lime Tree Primary Academy, Sale
Moorlands Junior School, Sale
Moss Park Infant School, Stretford
Moss Park Junior School, Stretford
Navigation Primary School, Altrincham
Old Trafford Community Academy, Old Trafford
Oldfield Brow Primary School, Altrincham
Our Lady of Lourdes RC Primary School, Partington
Our Lady of the Rosary RC Primary School, Davyhulme
Our Lady's RC Primary School, Old Trafford
Park Road Academy Primary School, Timperley
Park Road Sale Primary School, Sale
Partington Central Academy, Partington
St Alphonsus' RC Primary School, Old Trafford
St Anne's CE Primary, Sale
St Ann's RC Primary, Stretford
St Hilda's CE Primary School, Firswood
St Hugh of Lincoln RC Primary School, Stretford
St Hugh's RC Primary School, Timperley
St Joseph's RC Primary School, Sale
St Margaret Ward RC Primary School, Sale
St Mary's CE Primary School, Davyhulme
St Mary's CE Primary School, Sale
St Matthew's CE Primary School, Stretford
St Michael's CE Primary School, Flixton
St Monica's RC Primary School, Flixton
St Teresa's RC Primary School, Firswood
St Vincent's RC Primary School, Altrincham
Seymour Park Community Primary School, Old Trafford
Springfield Primary School, Sale
Stamford Park Primary School, Hale
Templemoor Infant and Nursery School, Sale
Tyntesfield Primary School, Sale
Urmston Primary School, Urmston
Victoria Park Infant School, Stretford
Victoria Park Junior School, Stretford
Well Green Primary School, Hale
Wellfield Infant and Nursery School, Sale
Wellfield Junior School, Sale
Willows Primary School, Timperley
Woodheys Primary School, Sale
Woodhouse Primary School, Davyhulme
Worthington Primary School, Sale

Non-selective secondary schools

Altrincham College, Timperley
Ashton-on-Mersey School, Sale
Blessed Thomas Holford Catholic College, Altrincham
Broadoak School, Partington
Flixton Girls' School, Flixton
Lostock High School, Stretford
North Cestrian School, Altrincham
St Antony's Roman Catholic School, Urmston
Sale High School, Sale
Stretford High School, Stretford
Wellacre Academy, Flixton
Wellington School, Timperley

Grammar schools
Altrincham Grammar School for Boys, Bowdon
Altrincham Grammar School for Girls, Bowdon
Loreto Grammar School, Altrincham
St Ambrose College, Hale Barns
Sale Grammar School, Sale
Stretford Grammar School, Stretford
Urmston Grammar Academy, Urmston

Special and alternative schools

Brentwood School, Sale
Delamere School, Flixton
Egerton High School, Davyhulme
Longford Park School, Stretford
Manor Academy, Sale
The Orchards, Stretford
Pictor Academy, Timperley
Trafford Alternative Education Provision, Timperley

Further education
Trafford College, Timperley

Independent schools

Primary and preparatory schools

Abbotsford Preparatory School, Urmston
Altrincham Preparatory School, Bowdon
Bowdon Preparatory School for Girls, Altrincham
Forest Park Preparatory School, Ashton upon Mersey
Forest School, Timperley
Hale Preparatory School, Hale
Loreto Preparatory School, Altrincham
St Ambrose Prep School, Hale Barns

Senior and all-through schools
Afifah School, Old Trafford

Special and alternative schools
Changing Lives, Carrington
Fairfield House School, Partington
St John Vianney School, Firswood

References

External links
 Trafford Council Schools and Colleges
 Ofsted (Office for Standards in Education)

 
Trafford